The Volleyball at the 2003 Southeast Asian Games was held from 5 to 12 December 2003 in Hanoi, Vietnam.

The indoor volleyball competition took place at Ninh Bình Province Gymnasium, in Ninh Bình Province, and the beach volleyball tournament was held at Nam Định Province Gymnasium in Nam Định Province.

Medal summary

Medal table

Medalists

Indoor volleyball

Men's tournament

Preliminary round

Group A

Group B

Knockout stage

5th–7th place play-off

Semifinals

Fifth place match

Bronze-medal match

Gold-medal match

Women's tournament

Round robin

Knockout stage

Semifinals

Bronze-medal match

Gold-medal match

Beach volleyball

Men's tournament

Preliminary round

Knockout stage

Gold-medal match

Women's tournament

Preliminary round

Knockout stage

Gold-medal match

References

2003 Southeast Asian Games events
2003 in volleyball
2003 in beach volleyball
Volleyball at the Southeast Asian Games